Franklinville is an unincorporated community and census-designated place (CDP) located within Franklin Township in Gloucester County, in the U.S. state of New Jersey. The area is served as United States Postal Service ZIP Code 08322.

As of the 2010 United States Census, the population for ZIP Code Tabulation Area 08322 was 10,524.

The Franklinville area of Franklin Township serves as the town center that mixes historic buildings with modern conveniences and stores.  A mix of merchants exist in the town center along with the Franklinville Volunteer Fire Company, Franklin Township Community Center and The Franklinville Inn, Franklinville Lake and the historic Franklinville train station. Franklinville was formerly named "Little Ease."

A five-way junction between New Jersey Route 47, County Route 538 and County Route 613 in the center of Franklinville provides access to Williamstown, Glassboro and Vineland.

Demographics

Education
The local school districts for the area is Franklin Township Public Schools (elementary) and Delsea Regional School District (secondary) with the latter operating Delsea Regional High School.

Guardian Angels Regional School is a K-8 school that operates under the auspices of the Roman Catholic Diocese of Camden and accepts students from Franklinville. Its PreK-3 campus is in Gibbstown while its 4-8 campus is in Paulsboro. Nativity Church in Franklinville is one of the sending parishes.

Wineries
 Coda Rossa Winery
 Tamuzza Vineyards

References

External links

 Franklinville Fire Company

Franklin Township, Gloucester County, New Jersey
Census-designated places in Gloucester County, New Jersey
Census-designated places in New Jersey
Unincorporated communities in Gloucester County, New Jersey
Unincorporated communities in New Jersey